Kanakagiri (also known as Suvarnagiri) is a town in Karnataka state of India. It was a provincial capital of the Mauryan Empire and later became the capital of the Nayaka dynasty who were the Palegars (feudatory) of the Vijayanagara Empire.
 It is also the site of the historical site Kanakachalapathi Temple (Kanakachalapathi Mandir) which was built by the Nayakas.

Geography 
Kanakagiri is situated in Koppal district, 20 km northwest of the town of Gangavati in the Indian state of Karnataka.

Temple

Kanakachalapathi temple was built by the Nayakas of Kanakgiri. Its halls and pillars are a unique example of south Indian architecture from the Vijayanagara period. The gopuras and walls are adorned with sculptures, including statues of Rajas and Ranis in black polished stone, plaster models, and wooden statues of mythological figures.

Kanakagiri Jain tirth is a complex of Jain temple built by Western Ganga Dynasty in the 5th or 6th century.

A royal bath constructed by Raja Venkatappa Nayaka in 1586 sits on the outskirts of Kanakgiri.

Fort
Hemagudda Fort, about 20 km from Kanakagiri is next to the Kammatadurga Fort of Gandugali Kumara Rama. The fort was constructed in the 14th century. The fort has a temple of Durga Devi celebrating Dasara.

Utsav
Kanakagiri Utsav is an annual fair associated with the Kanakachalapathi temple during Phalguna.

Gallery

See also
 Kanakagiri Jain Shri kshetra
 Temples of North Karnataka
 Vijayanagara Empire
 List of Vijayanagara era temples in Karnataka
 Vijayanagara architecture
 Mauryan Empire
Hampi
Anegondi
Karatagi
Gangavathi
Koppal
Karnataka

References 

Cities and towns in Koppal district
Tourism in Karnataka
Hindu temples in Koppal district
Vijayanagara Empire